The Garfield Tea House in Long Branch, New Jersey, is the only remaining structure directly related to President James A. Garfield's final trip to the Jersey Shore. The Garfield Tea House was built from the railroad ties used to lay the emergency track that transported a dying President Garfield from the nearby Elberon train station to the oceanfront cottage where he died 12 days later.

History

Garfield was a regular visitor to Long Branch. Less than four months after taking office, the president was shot on July 2, 1881, while waiting to board a train from Washington to Long Branch by Charles J. Guiteau, a delusional religious fanatic who was disgruntled by failed efforts to secure a federal post.

On September 5, 1881, more than half a mile of railroad tracks were laid out in less than 24 hours by local residents when they learned that the president, who was in poor condition, was coming to Long Branch from Washington DC to help him recover from his gunshot wounds. Rather than requiring the president to move by a horse-drawn carriage over rough roads, the tracks enabled Garfield to be brought directly to the front door of the oceanfront Francklyn cottage from the local Elberon train station. The railroad spur ran down the middle of a local road, which today is Lincoln Avenue. President Garfield arrived in Elberon on the evening of September 6.

After Garfield died 12 days later on September 19, the tracks were torn up and the wooden ties were purchased by actor Oliver Byron, who had local carpenter William Presley build the Garfield Tea House with them. It first stood in the yard of Byron's summer cottage.  One of the original rails is used as the ridgepole supporting the roof.  The original colors of the building were red, white, and blue; today it is red and white.  After several moves, including one to the Presley home in North Long Branch, the tea house now rests on the Long Branch Historical Museum grounds on Ocean Avenue near the former site of Francklyn cottage. The remains of the railroad spur tracks near the former cottage became part of a small one-lane residential road near the beach which is now called Garfield Road.

Preservation
The Long Branch Historical Museum Association, which owns the structure, has mounted an aggressive effort to restore the Church of the Presidents and its grounds, on which the tea house rests. Restoration of the tea house is part of the four-phase preservation plan to preserve the Church of the Presidents, currently in its second phase of restoration. The Garfield Tea House is located at 1260 Ocean Avenue in Long Branch, just across the street from the Atlantic Ocean.

Preservation of the tea house will require lifting the building above grade, excavating to create a level surface, pouring a six-inch reinforced slab, and lowering the building onto the new foundation.  The wood shingle roof must be replaced and the paint stripped from the exterior.  Deteriorated railroad ties will be epoxy-consolidated; they will not be replaced.

Once the Church of the Presidents is restored, it and the Garfield Tea House will open to the public, serving as a museum to the presidents and people who vacationed here, and as a center of study of Long Branch and Jersey Shore history, particularly during the Gilded Age and especially of presidential recreation at that time.

See also
Ulysses S. Grant Cottage

References

External links
Church of the Presidents Web site

Buildings and structures in Monmouth County, New Jersey
History of New Jersey
Landmarks in New Jersey
Presidency of James A. Garfield
Long Branch, New Jersey
Assassination of James A. Garfield